Branciforte Creek is a  long watercourse in Santa Cruz County, California, United States. Branciforte Creek rises on the western slopes of the Santa Cruz Mountains and discharges to the San Lorenzo River, which in turn empties into the Pacific Ocean. Within the State of California Branciforte Creek is classified within the Central Coast Basin. As of the year 2002, the State of California has designated Branciforte Creek as impaired with respect to turbidity and pathogens.

In 2001, a stream restoration project was funded by the State of California to remove barriers to anadromous fish migration in Branciforte Creek, with emphasis upon enhancing juvenile migration.  Ongoing flood control maintenance is performed on certain lower reaches of Branciforte Creek.

See also
Sediment
Steelhead

References

Rivers of Santa Cruz County, California
Santa Cruz Mountains
Rivers of Northern California
Tributaries of the San Lorenzo River